Redrow plc is one of the largest British housebuilders with a network of 14 operational divisions across the UK. It is based in Flintshire, Wales and employs 2,300 people. It is listed on the London Stock Exchange and is currently a constituent of the FTSE 250 Index.

History

Steve Morgan had been working as a site agent for Wellington Civil Engineering when, in 1974, the parent company decided it was to be closed. Morgan offered to take over the contract, borrowed £5,000 from his father, and completed the contract at a profit. Further work was carried out for Wellington and, still aged only 21, Morgan registered his new company – Redrow. Redrow gradually expanded through small civil engineering work and, with Simon Macbryde, formed a separate building company; these were later merged to leave Macbryde with 17 percent of the enlarged company. Geographically, Redrow moved from its north Wales base into Cheshire and in the early 1980s made significant construction acquisitions in Manchester and the Wirral.

Redrow's entry into housebuilding came in 1982 and by 1985 it had grown sufficiently to separate it out from the construction business. A small acquisition in Kent provided the base for a south-east housing operation; a midlands housing subsidiary was formed in 1986 and in 1987 Redrow bought Whelmar Lancashire, one of the five housing subsidiaries then being sold by Christian Salvesen. By now, Redrow was selling over 1,000 houses a year. Further expansion took Redrow into the south-west, south Wales and Yorkshire but Redrow had pulled out of the vulnerable south-east market just ahead of the 1989 property collapse. Redrow returned to the south-east in 1993 as the housing recession neared its end, buying Costain Homes from the troubled Costain Group; this took Redrow's housing sales up to 2,000 a year.

The construction business was sold and with Redrow now purely a development business the company was floated on the London Stock Exchange in 1994.  Redrow grew steadily through the rest of the decade reaching sales of 3,000 a year. In 2000 Steve Morgan announced his intention to leave the company, retaining only a 14 percent stake in the company. Paul Pedley, who had joined Redrow as finance director in 1995, took over as managing director. In 2006 Redrow saw its 50,000th customer. In 2009, Steve Morgan returned to Redrow as Executive Chairman, having increased his shareholding to just under 30 percent.

In 2010, Redrow launched its Heritage Collection  followed by the Regent Collection  and more modern Abode Collection.

In February 2017, Redrow acquired Radleigh Homes in Derby, an established company which delivered 200 new homes in 2016.  It has since been re-branded to Redrow Homes (East Midlands). Then, in September 2017, it was announced that Morgan would "ease back" to a non-executive chairman role with Redrow.

On 18 October 2018, Redrow announced its 100,000th customer and released statistics on the number of direct jobs it had created (36,000), including 2,000 trainees, and a further 200,000 indirect employees. On 7 November 2018, it was announced that Steve Morgan would retire from the company in March 2019 with John Tutte taking over as executive chairman and Matthew Pratt as chief operating officer. Tutte himself announced his retirement in 2020 with Matthew Pratt taking over as Group Chief Executive.

Like most housebuilders, Redrow temporarily closed most of its sites during the COVID-19 pandemic in the United Kingdom during early 2020. The site closures pushed house sales down by a third. In a trading update, Redrow said it had completed 4,032 homes up to 28 June 2020, compared to 6,443 in 2019. Turnover was expected to be £1.34bn against £2.11bn in 2019.

In June 2020, following a review of its divisional businesses, Redrow decided to scale-back its operations in London to focus on its Colindale Gardens development and announced it would continue to target the Group's future growth on the higher returning regional businesses and the Heritage product. In the same year Redrow partnered with John Moores University to offer a degree in Construction Management, receiving over 800 applications. Previously the degree had only been open to Redrow employees but the company opened it up to outside applicants.

In June 2021, the company announced the appointment of Richard Akers as its new non‐executive chairman effective from September 2021. The company also announced a new Southern division to expand the company’s reach to Surrey and Sussex in June 2021 which was opened in May 2022. In November 2021, the company joined the UNFCCC Race to Zero and signed up to the Science Based Targets initiative (SBTi)’s highest business ambition of pursuing efforts to limit global warming to 1.5°C.

In 2022, Redrow was included in the FT - Statistic annual climate leaders list, which includes companies that have achieved the greatest reductions in their Scope 1 and 2 greenhouse gas emissions intensity over a five-year period (2015-20). The company was also admitted to the FTSE4Good Index Series, for demonstrating strong Environmental, Social and Governance (ESG) practices.

In October 2022, Redrow became one of the first house builders to implement the New Homes Quality Board’s new code of practice, an independent not-for-profit organisation that has been set up to offer better protection and increased transparency for customers.

In January 2023, Redrow became the first large housebuilder to introduce air source heat pumps in all its upcoming developments as the company moves away from traditional gas boilers. Underfloor heating will also be provided as standard in its detached homes. The move to air source heat pumps will have the biggest impact to date on the efficiency of Redrow homes as it moves towards all-electric power systems in line with its commitment to achieving net zero carbon by 2050.

Flagship developments
The company's flagship developments include:
Woodford Garden Village: Woodford Garden Village in Cheshire is the first garden village for over 100 years in the North West of England and utilises over 500 acres of brownfield land, previously used for aircraft manufacturing. Redrow will be developing 900 new homes alongside 50 acres of green public spaces.
Ebbsfleet Green, Kent: Redrow's Ebbsfleet Green will comprise 950 new homes, along with a village centre, park, sports pitches, a hotel and a pub, and a primary school. This development will form part of the plans for a garden city at Ebbsfleet, with up to 15,000 new homes, based predominately on brownfield land, or former quarries. This development, is also part of the NHS Healthy New Towns network.
Plasdwr: Redrow is developing around 2,000 homes in Plasdwr, north west Cardiff.  The £2 billion Cardiff ‘garden village’ will comprise four different zones, each with a central square and a primary school.
Colindale Gardens: a £1 billion mixed use development in north west London, which will have more than 2,900 homes. At 47 acres in total, the regeneration utilised a tower block and adjacent land from the Peel Centre, formerly part of the Hendon Police College.
Ledsham Garden Village: A 105-hectare site in South Wirral will become a sustainable new community of up to 2,000 homes.  It will create employment, education and leisure opportunities and green open spaces.
Amington Garden Village, Tamworth: This 60-hectare former golf course site will feature up to 1,100 new homes and a package of community investment worth £14 million, including funding towards the cost of building a new primary school, a new community woodland and extending the Hodge Lane Local Nature Reserve.

The company has commissioned research by two academics, Dr Stefan Kruczkowski and Dr Laura B. Alvarez, in order to develop eight principles of creating better places.

References

External links
Yahoo profile

Construction and civil engineering companies established in 1974
Companies of Wales
Housebuilding companies of the United Kingdom
Companies listed on the London Stock Exchange
Organisations based in Flintshire
1974 establishments in England